This is a list of episodes of the 2014 Japanese tokusatsu film/television miniseries Zero: Black Blood, a side story of 2005 & 2006's Garo.

Episodes


{|class="wikitable plainrowheaders" style="width:98%; margin:auto; background:#FFF;"
|-style="border-bottom:8px solid silver"
! style="width:3em;"  | No.
! Title
! style="width:12em;" | Original air date
|-

|}

References

See also

Zero: Black Blood episodes